Signe Lund-Skabo (15 April 1868 – 6 April 1950) was a Norwegian composer and music teacher.

Biography
Signe Lund was born in Christiania (now Oslo), Norway. She was the daughter of Lieutenant Colonel Henrik Louis Bull Lund (1838–1891), and pianist Birgitte Theodora Carlsen (1843–1913), and was the sister of the artist Henrik Lund (1879–1935) and the aunt of the sculptor Knut Henrik Lund (1909-1991). She studied with Erika Nilsson, Per Winge and Iver Holter at the Oslo Conservatory of Music  (Musikkonservatoriet i Oslo). Later she studied in Berlin with Wilhelm Berger and also in Copenhagen and Paris. After completing her studies she worked as a teacher in Norway. She married Jørgen Skabo and later French architect George Robards.

Lund emigrated to the United States about 1900 and took a position teaching at Mayville State Normal School in Mayville, North Dakota. She became active in the North Dakota Socialist party and Nonpartisan League and circulated petitions for the release of anti-war activist Kate Richards O'Hare from state prison in Missouri, which led to her dismissal from the Mayville teaching position.

She later worked in New York City and Chicago as a performer and lecturer until 1920. Lund received the King's Medal of Merit for contributions to strengthening of the relationship between the United States and Norway, but lost her U.S. citizenship after World War II and had already returned to Norway. She died in Oslo.

Works
Lund composed a number of powerful works. Selected compositions include:
Norske Smaastubber, Op. 15, for piano (1893)
"Legende", from  Quatre morceaux, Op. 16, for piano (1896)
Wahrhaftig (Et sandt Ord), Op. 28 no. 1 (Text: Heinrich Heine)
Valse de Concert, Op. 40, for piano four-hands (1914)
The Road to France, march (also chorus), for orchestra (1917)
Concerto for Piano and Orchestra, Op. 63 (1931)

Autobiography
Sol gjennem skyer, livserindringer (Gyldendal, Vol. I, 1944, and II, 1946) (reprinted lulu.com/spotlight/borrel/).

References

External links

1868 births
1950 deaths
Musicians from Oslo
19th-century classical composers
20th-century classical composers
Norwegian classical composers
Norwegian emigrants to the United States
Norwegian music educators
Former United States citizens
Women classical composers
19th-century Norwegian composers
Women music educators
Recipients of the King's Medal of Merit
20th-century women composers
19th-century women composers